The following are the Iran women's national football team results in its official international matches.

Results

2000s

2010s

2020s

 Match against Sweden was not official since Sweden made 8 substitutions.
 Malavan F.C. participated at 2010 WAFF Championship instead of Iran national team.
 2012 Olympic Games Qualifier matches against Jordan, Vietnam, Thailand and Uzbekistan were awarded 3–0 by FIFA.
 Iran won 4-2 over Jordan in penalty shootouts 2022 AFC Women's Asian Cup qualification Group G
Match result versus India at 2022 AFC Women's Asian Cup was voided since few days later India was forced to withdraw from the competition.

References
 FIFA.com

results
2005–06 in Iranian football
2007–08 in Iranian football
2009–10 in Iranian football
2010–11 in Iranian football
2011–12 in Iranian football
2012–13 in Iranian football
2014–15 in Iranian football